Tuti (also Romanized as Ţūţī; also known as Kalāteh-ye Tūtī, Kalāteh Tūti, and Kalāteh-ye Bāgh) is a village in Khusf Rural District, Central District, Khusf County, South Khorasan Province, Iran. At the 2006 census, its population was 137, in 39 families.

References 

Populated places in Khusf County